The 1862 New Hampshire gubernatorial election was held on March 11, 1862.

Incumbent Republican Governor Nathaniel S. Berry defeated Democratic nominee George Stark in a re-match of the previous year's election.

General election

Candidates
Nathaniel S. Berry, Republican, incumbent Governor
George Stark, Democratic, civil engineer, brigadier-general of the third brigade of New Hampshire militia, Democratic nominee for Governor in 1861
Paul J. Wheeler, Union Democrat, incumbent member of the New Hampshire House of Representatives

Results

References

1862
New Hampshire
Gubernatorial